Garibashevo (Gäräbaş) is a rural locality (a village) in Shulganovsky Selsoviet, Tatyshlinsky District, Bashkortostan, Russia. The population was 446 as of 2010. There are 8 streets.

Geography 
Garibashevo is located 42 km southwest of Verkhniye Tatyshly (the district's administrative centre) by road. Chishma is the nearest rural locality.

References 

Rural localities in Tatyshlinsky District